The Moluccan woodcock (Scolopax rochussenii), also known as Obi woodcock, is a medium-sized, approximately 40 cm long, forest wader with a long, dark bill, orange buff below and black barred upperparts. The plumage is marked with large buff spots. This species is the largest of the woodcocks, approximately 25% bigger than Eurasian woodcock.

An Indonesian endemic, the Moluccan woodcock is restricted to Obi and Bacan, two small islands in North Maluku. It is known from eight specimens, with the most recent collected in 1980. Nothing is known of its habits.

Due to ongoing habitat loss and limited range, the Moluccan woodcock is evaluated as Vulnerable on the IUCN Red List of Threatened Species.

In 2013, the first ever photographs of a living Moluccan woodcock were published.

References 

 Shorebirds by Hayman, Marchant and Prater,

External links 
 BirdLife Species Factsheet

Moluccan woodcock
Birds of the Maluku Islands
Moluccan woodcock
Taxa named by Hermann Schlegel